is a species of flowering plant in the family Thymelaeaceae that is endemic to the Bonin Islands, Tōkyō Metropolis, Japan.

Taxonomy
The species was first described by Japanese botanist Gen-ichi Koidzumi in 1919. Koidzumi noted its closeness to Wikstroemia retusa.

EcologyWikstroemia pseudoretusa seeds an important part of the diet of the Ogaswara greenfinch.

Conservation statusWikstroemia pseudoretusa'' is classed as Near Threatened on the Ministry of the Environment Red List.

See also

 Ogasawara subtropical moist forests
 Ogasawara National Park

References

pseudoretusa
Flora of the Bonin Islands
Endemic flora of Japan
Plants described in 1919